Damphreux-Lugnez is a municipality in the district of Porrentruy in the canton of Jura in Switzerland. It was established on 1 January 2023 with the merger of the municipalities of Damphreux and Lugnez.

History 
Damphreux was first mentioned in 1161 as Damfriol. Lugnez was first mentioned around 501-600 as Lugduniaco. In 1225, it was mentioned as Lunigie. On 1 January 2023, these two municipalities were merged to form the new municipality of Damphreux-Lugnez.

References

External links 

Municipalities of the canton of Jura
2023 establishments in Switzerland